Nils Backstrom (June 13, 1901 – June 18, 1978) was an American cross-country skier. Born in Sweden, he immigrated to the United States in 1928. He competed in the 50 km event at the 1932 and 1936 Winter Olympics and placed 19th and 33rd, respectively.

References

1901 births
1978 deaths
American male cross-country skiers
Olympic cross-country skiers of the United States
Cross-country skiers at the 1932 Winter Olympics
Cross-country skiers at the 1936 Winter Olympics
Swedish emigrants to the United States